Consonant is an alternative rock group formed by singer/guitarist Clint Conley in 2001. 

In the late 1970s, Conley cofounded Mission of Burma, a pioneering Boston post punk group. After mostly dropping out of music for the 1980s and 1990s, Conley began writing songs, often with input from poet Holly Anderson.

Conley formed Consonant in 2001, along with guitarist Chris Brokaw (Come, Codeine), bassist Winston Braman (Fuzzy), and drummer Matt Kadane (previously of Bedhead). Though notably less experimental than Mission of Burma, critic Mark Deming declares Consonant is "a fine return to the spotlight for Conley".

Discography
Consonant (April 9, 2002)
Love and Affliction (August 19, 2003)

References

Alternative rock groups from Massachusetts
Musical groups from Boston
Musical groups established in 2001
Mission of Burma